The Budoš Limestone ("Budos Mountain Limestone") is a geological formation in Montenegro, dating to 180 million years ago, and covering the Toarcian stage of the Jurassic Period. It has been considered an important setting in Balkan paleontology, as it represents a unique terrestrial setting with abundant plant material, one of the few know from the Toarcian of Europe. It is the regional equivalent to the Toarcian units of Spain such as the Turmiel Formation, units like the Azilal Formation of Morocco and others from the Mediterranean such as the Posidonia Beds of Greece and the Marne di Monte Serrone of Italy. In the Adriatic section, this unit is an equivalent of the Calcare di Sogno of north Italy, as well represents almost the same type of ecosystem recovered in the older (Pliensbachian) Rotzo Formation of the Venetian region, know also for its rich floral record.

Description 
The Toarcian paleogeography of Montenegro was characterised by two major units, mostly found in the Dinarides: the High Karst Zone, representing a Carbonate Platform, concretely the Adriatic-Dinaric Carbonate Platform and the Budva Basin, that represented a pelagic setting where ammonites are abundant. The Budva basin evolution in the Toarcian was marked by the changes in the sea level, developing a distally steepened ramp until the Lower Toarcian, and an accretionary rimmed platform in younger layers. The Adriatic-Dinaric Carbonate Platform is well measured at the Mount Rumija where the transitional facies between the platform setting and the deeper pelagic environment is seen, recovering a lateral transition from a lagoonal environment exposed in Seoce to the platform edge, exposed in Tejani (called Tejani section), and finally the deeper water environment, called Livari section can be observed at the own Mount Rumija.

The Seoce Section is likely linked with the Budoš Limestone depositional setting, found mostly on the mountain of the same name on the Dinarides near Nikšić. The main unit is lithologically almost identical to the major fossiliferous levels of the Rotzo Formation, composed by bituminous limestones and marly limestones (fenestrate limestones and tempestites) with several episodes of emersions, all of coastal origin and rich in plant detritus and leaf remains, connected to the typical Lithiotis reefs found in the Pliensbachian-Toarcian carbonate platforms in the adriatic region. The Budoš Limestone was delimited as younger than the Rotzo Formation due to its floral composition and the fact is overlain by the Late Toarcian-Aalenian  greenish local claystone-limestone layers.

The unit is mostly known by its rich macroflora, the most complete and only known of the mediterranean Toarcian realm, with several characteristics, such as the abundant presence of thermophilic Bennettitales and the dominance of the Seed Fern Pachypteris, that grew on semi-arid climates. Most of the research of the flora was done by Pantic between 1952 & 1981, recovering abundant Macroflora and Palynomorphs. Several genera where recovered, such as Coniopteris (Dicksoniaceae), Lindleycladus (Krassiloviaceae) and Elatides (Taxodiaceae).



Ecosystem

It was considered initially that this flora grew in a continental setting, appearing on deposits that resemble modern inland deposition on ferric soils, thus, in a large inland valley with semi-arid conditions but with nearby large water bodies such as lakes.  Latter however, was interpreted that this flora developed on an island setting in the Dinaric Carbonate Platform, likely linked with the exposed layers of Seoce. This setting would be made of the emerged Budoshi High, representing an island flora; a humid belt would have existed along the shore, while coniferous vegetation would have prevailed in the drier interior.

The main consensus is that the layers rich in flora belong to a Bahamian-type Mangrove system developed on a coastal setting with a nearby arid inland setting dominated by Cheirolepidiaceae conifers and Bennettites, that was either a submarine intraoceanic carbonate platform or part of a large landmass. The Mangrove system was mostly composed of seed ferns bearing the leaf genus Pachypteris linked with complex root systems that cover most of the layers, developed over and linked with the local aberrant bivalve (Lithiotis) reefs and evolved as a belt around the coast, yet is unknown how far reached. The inland setting was dry and with common wildfire activity, as proven by the great amount of charcoal recovered in some of the layers. The Lithiotis layers are intercalated by oolitic and oncolitic layers of likely subtidal origin, with several coastal cycles measured, such as development of lagoons and complete flooding of the vegetation levels, as well small coal-dominated sections. The ingression-regression trend allowed the development of the local mangroves.

The same type of ecosystem was also recovered more recently on slightly older (Late Pliensbachian) rocks on Albania, with also great dominance of the genus Pachypteris linked with root systems along Lithiotis reefs, with evidence of catastrophic events which “killed” the flora. This type of layers have been vinculated with the early evolution of crabs.

Fossil content

Flora

Palynology

Plant remains

Bivalves
The Budos Mountain facies, like the Rotzo Formation, is known mostly due to its massive bivalve associations of the genera Lithiotis, Cochlearites and Lithioperna that extended all along the Pliensbachian-Toarcian Adriatic-Dinaric-Hellenic Platforms forming mass accumulations of specimens that formed Reef-Like structures. This fauna appeared after the early Pliensbachian C-cycle perturbation, that triggered the diffusion of the Lithiotis Fauna, noted on the rapid widespread of this biota after the event layers. All of the genera related with this fauna appeared on the lower Jurassic, and all but one became extinct before the Middle Jurassic. This "Reefs" had a strong zonation, starting with the bivalves Gervilleioperna and Mytiloperna, restricted to intertidal and shallow-subtidal facies. Lithioperna is limited to  lagoonal subtidal facies and even in some low-oxygen environments. Finally Lithiotis and Cochlearites are found in subtidal facies, constructing buildups. This sections formed various kinds of ecosystems on the Trento platform, where it appeared in branched corals filled with (Spongiomorpha), Domal corals (Stromatoporida), tubular corals, Styllophyllidae corals, unidentified Cerioidea colonial corals, regular echinoid debris, sponges, and the solitary coral Opelismilia sp., with also aggregated snail shells.

See also 
 List of fossiliferous stratigraphic units in Italy
 Toarcian turnover
 Toarcian formations

 Marne di Monte Serrone, Italy
 Calcare di Sogno, Italy
 Posidonia Shale, Lagerstätte in Germany
 Ciechocinek Formation, Germany and Poland
 Krempachy Marl Formation, Poland & Slovakia
 Lava Formation, Lithuania
 Azilal Group, North Africa
 Whitby Mudstone, England
 Fernie Formation, Alberta and British Columbia
 Poker Chip Shale
 Whiteaves Formation, British Columbia
 Navajo Sandstone, Utah
 Los Molles Formation, Argentina
 Mawson Formation, Antarctica
 Kandreho Formation, Madagascar
 Kota Formation, India
 Cattamarra Coal Measures, Australia

References 

Geologic formations of Montenegro
Jurassic System of Europe
Toarcian Stage
Limestone formations
Open marine deposits
Fossiliferous stratigraphic units of Europe
Paleontology in Montenegro
Formations